Reynoutria ciliinervis is a species of flowering plant in the family Polygonaceae, native to Korea and China – north-central China, south-central China, northeast China (Manchuria) and Qinghai. It was first described  by Takenoshin Nakai in 1914 (as Pleuropterus ciliinervis) and transferred to Reynoutria by Harold Norman Moldenke in 1941. It has also been placed in Fallopia and Polygonum.

References

Polygonoideae
Flora of North-Central China
Flora of South-Central China
Flora of Manchuria
Flora of Korea
Flora of Qinghai
Plants described in 1941